Albert Lee Toon Jr. (born April 30, 1963) is an American former professional football player who was a wide receiver for the New York Jets of the National Football League (NFL) for eight seasons.  A two-time First-team All-Big Ten pick at the University of Wisconsin, Toon set several school football records for the Wisconsin Badgers.  The three-time Pro Bowl selectee played his entire NFL career with the Jets (1985-1992), leading his team and the league in receptions during the late 1980s.  He is considered to be among the Jets' all-time greatest wide receivers and overall players in franchise history.

Early life
In high school Toon was well known for his accomplishments in track and field. Toon is one of three Newport News Peninsula District athletes to surpass 50 feet in the triple jump, which he did three times. He reached 23 feet in the long jump. Toon used that jumping ability as a wide receiver on Menchville High School's football team.

Toon played football and ran track at the University of Wisconsin–Madison from 1981 to 1984.  Toon set a Big Ten single game receiver record while at the UW and established new school career football records for receptions (131), receiving yards (2,103) and touchdown catches (19) at the end of this three season tenure for the Wisconsin Badgers. He also set Big Ten and school records in track and field in the Triple Jump while qualifying for the Olympic Trials in 1983 in the 110 High Hurdles and the Triple Jump.

Professional career
He was selected by the New York Jets in the 1st round (10th overall) of the 1985 NFL Draft.  Toon managed to become the Jets' second leading receiver during his 1985 rookie season. He was selected to the Pro Bowl three times. Toon's best year as a pro came in the 1988 season when he led the league with 93 receptions.  Toon retired at the age of 29 in 1992 as a result of suffering at least nine concussions over his eight-year career.

Toon is one of two retired players in NFL history to play fewer than 110 games and still record over 500 receptions.  The other is Hall of Famer Kellen Winslow Sr.

After football
In 1995, he was one of nine founding members of Capitol Bank, a local community bank on whose board of directors he still serves. He was previously a president of the University of Wisconsin's National W Club, a varsity letter winners club. He also developed AT8 Companies to own, develop, and manage his commercial real estate portfolio. He also became both a Taco Bell franchisee and Hilton Garden Inn franchisee after his 8-year NFL stint. Additionally as a Community Center board member he and his team of locals developed the Boy's and Girl's Club of Dane County.

Toon served on the board of directors of the National Guardian Life Insurance Company (NGL). He also served on the board of directors of the Green Bay Packers. He is now an owner of one of the largest privately owned and operated multifaceted design/build landscape companies in the Midwest, Olson Toon Landscaping, Inc.
He is an investor in Wisconsin Burger King Franchise companies since 1992.
Toon, who suffered from post-concussion syndrome, has improved to the point that he was able to compete in a triathlon in 2004.

Personal life
Toon is married to Jane and has a son and three daughters. His son, Nick, was a football standout in high school at Middleton, Wisconsin and played as a receiver for the Wisconsin Badgers, as his father did. Nicholas Toon was drafted by the New Orleans Saints in the 4th round of the 2012 NFL Draft and played four years in the NFL. He now owns and runs an online retail sales business along with a focus on real estate ownership and management with his wife.

His daughter, Kirby, attended UW–Madison as a preferred walk-on in volleyball. Kirby currently is working for Kimberly Clark. His other daughters, Molly and Sydney, also played volleyball. Molly was a Final Four participant while playing volleyball at the University of Michigan and worked for Aerotek in Arizona, while Toon's youngest daughter, Sydney played two seasons of volleyball at University of Wisconsin Whitewater following her prep experience at Middleton High School. His daughter Molly was murdered in an apparent murder-suicide case by her husband in 2021.

References

1963 births
Living people
Sportspeople from Newport News, Virginia
African-American players of American football
American football wide receivers
Wisconsin Badgers football players
New York Jets players
American Conference Pro Bowl players
21st-century African-American people
20th-century African-American sportspeople